A gigolo is a male escort or social companion who is supported by a person in a continuing relationship, often living in her residence or having to be present at her beck and call.

The term gigolo usually implies a man who adopts a lifestyle consisting of a number of such relationships serially rather than having other means of support.

The gigolo is expected to provide companionship, to serve as a consistent escort with good manners and social skills, and often to serve as a dancing partner as required by the woman in exchange for the support. Many gifts, such as expensive clothing and an automobile to drive, may be lavished upon him. The relationship may include sexual services as well, and he also can be referred to as a "kept man."

The word gigolo may be traced to a first usage in English as a neologism during the 1920s as a back-formation from gigolette, a French word for a woman hired as a dancing partner. Both gigolo and gigolette were first recorded in French in the middle part of the 19th century, referring to dance club denizens in Montmartre paid to dance with, and sometimes have sex with, unaccompanied male visitors.

In popular culture

Films
 Gigolo (1926) – American silent romance drama film produced by Cecil B. DeMille
 Just a Gigolo (1931) –  American romantic comedy directed by Jack Conway, starring William Haines, Irene Purcell, C. Aubrey Smith and Ray Milland
 Evenings for Sale (1932) – American romantic comedy, starring Herbert Marshall, Sari Maritza, Charlie Ruggles and Mary Boland
 Hold Back the Dawn (1941) – American drama starring Charles Boyer and Olivia de Havilland
 Sunset Boulevard (1950) – American film noir co-written and directed by Billy Wilder, starring William Holden and Gloria Swanson
 The Gigolo (1960) – French romantic drama film written and directed by Jacques Deray. It is loosely based on the novel Le Gigolo written by Jacques Robert.
 Breakfast at Tiffany's (1961) – American romantic comedy starring Audrey Hepburn and George Peppard
 Just a Gigolo (1978) – West German film directed by David Hemmings and starring David Bowie
 American Gigolo (1980) – American romantic crime film written and directed by Paul Schrader, and starring Richard Gere, Lauren Hutton & Hector Elizondo
 Galactic Gigolo (1987) – American science-fiction comedy film directed by Gorman Bechard 
 Deuce Bigalow: Male Gigolo (1999) – American sex comedy film starring Rob Schneider, followed by the 2005 sequel Deuce Bigalow: European Gigolo
 The Roman Spring of Mrs. Stone (2003) –  American television film remake of the 1961 film of the same name. Directed by Robert Allan Ackerman, it stars Helen Mirren and Brian Dennehy
 The Gigolos (2005) British comedy film directed by Richard Bracewell, starring Sacha Tarter, Ben Willbond, and Susannah York
 A French Gigolo (2008) – French drama film directed by Josiane Balasko and starring Nathalie Baye. It was based on the novel "Cliente" by Josiane Balasko
 Spread (2009) – American sex comedy film directed by David Mackenzie, starring Ashton Kutcher and Anne Heche. It was also released as L.A. Gigolo
 Fading Gigolo (2013) – American comedy film directed, written by, and starring John Turturro, co-starring Woody Allen, Sharon Stone & Sofia Vergara
 The Gigolo (Chinese: 鴨王) (2015) – Hong Kong erotic drama film directed and written by Au Cheuk-man and starring Dominic Ho and Candy Yuen, followed by the 2016 sequel The Gigolo 2 (Chinese: 鴨王2)
 Good Luck to You, Leo Grande (2022) – Directed by Sophie Hyde and written by Katy Brand. Stars Emma Thompson and Daryl McCormack.

Music
 "I'm a Gigolo" – 1929 Broadway show tune by Cole Porter, written for the revue Wake Up and Dream
 "Just a Gigolo" – adapted by Irving Caesar in 1929 from the Austrian tango "Schöner Gigolo, armer Gigolo"; paired as a medley with "I Ain't Got Nobody" by Louis Prima in 1956
 "The Gigolo" – 1966 album by jazz trumpeter Lee Morgan
 “Gigolo Aunt” – 1970 song by Syd Barrett
 "Gigolo" – 1981 dance single by Mary Wells
 "Gigolo" – 1982 Song by Meiko Nakahara
 "Gigolos Get Lonely Too"  – 1983 song by The Time
 "Gigolo" – 1987 single by The Damned
 "Gigolo" – 1991 song by Liz Phair later rerecorded as "Can't Get Out of What I'm Into"
 "American Gigolo" – 2001 song by Weezer
 "Gigolo" – 2003 song by Nick Cannon featuring R. Kelly   
 "Gigolo" – 2006 song by Greek singer Helena Paparizou

TV series
 Just a Gigolo (1993) – British sitcom starring Tony Slattery
 Absolutely Fabulous, TV episode "Sex", (1995) – British sitcom starring Jennifer Saunders and Joanna Lumley
 Gigolos (2011 – 2016) – American reality television series about the lives of five male escorts in Las Vegas
 American Gigolo (2022) – Romance series starring Jon Bernthal.

Novels
 Hold Back the Dawn (1940) by Ketti Frings
 The Roman Spring of Mrs. Stone (1950) by Tennessee Williams
 Breakfast at Tiffany's (1958) by Truman Capote
 Le Gigolo (1959) by Jacques Robert
 Cliente (2004) by Josiane Balasko

See also 
 
 Male prostitution
 Male prostitution in the arts
 Female sex tourism
 Escort agency
 Prostitution
 Cicisbeo

References

Further reading 
 

1920s neologisms
Escorts
Male prostitution
Sex industry
Male prostitutes by type
Gendered occupations